Květa Peschke and Francesca Schiavone were the defending champions, but neither participated in the doubles competition of the tournament. Iveta Benešová and Janette Husárová won the title, defeating Victoria Azarenka and Shahar Pe'er 6–3, 6–4 in the final.

Seeds

Draw

References
 Main Draw

2007 Doubles
Fortis Championships Luxembourg - Doubles
2007 in Luxembourgian tennis